Gauntlet Ridge is a flat-topped, mainly ice-covered ridge, or peninsula, which separates the mouths of Nascent Glacier and Ridgeway Glacier where they discharge into Lady Newnes Bay, Victoria Land, Antarctica. The name suggests the appearance of the feature in plan and was applied by the New Zealand Antarctic Place-Names Committee in 1966.

References

Peninsulas of Antarctica
Landforms of Victoria Land
Borchgrevink Coast